Irish Brazilians ( or) are Brazilian citizens of Irish ancestry, or Irish-born people residing in Brazil. Many Irish immigrants to Brazil changed their surnames to resemble Portuguese names more closely, often losing the common prefix 'O'.

History

The first known Irish settler in Brazil was a missionary, Thomas Field, who arrived to Brazil in late 1577 and spent three years in Piratininga (present-day São Paulo). In 1612, the Irish the Irish brothers Philip and James Purcell established a colony in Tauregue, at the mouth of the Amazon River,  where English, Dutch, and French settlements were also established. Many of the colonists traded in tobacco, dyes, and hardwoods. A second group of Irish settlers led by Bernardo O'Brien of County Clare arrived in 1620. The first recorded Saint Patrick's Day celebration was on 17 March  1770.

During the Cisplatine War, Brazil sent recruiters to Ireland to recruit men as soldiers for the war against Argentina. Any Irish that signed up for the Brazilian army were promised that if they enlisted they would be given a grant of land after five years of service. Approximately 2,400 men were recruited and when they arrived in Brazil (many with their families), they were completely neglected by the government. The Irish mutinied together with a German regiment, and for a few days there was open warfare on the streets of Rio de Janeiro. While most were ultimately sent home or re-emigrated to Canada or Argentina, some did stay and were sent to form a colony in the province of Bahia.

Several attempts were made by Brazil to bring in more Irish immigrants to settle in the country, however, much of the land given to the settlers was porous or in extremely remote locations. Many of the Irish settlers died or re-emigrated to other countries. At the same time, several prominent Irish figures served in diplomatic posts in Brazil for the United Kingdom (as Ireland was part of the British Empire). Irish Nationalist and British diplomat Roger Casement, served as British Consul in Santos, Belém, and in Rio de Janeiro.

See also

 Brazil–Ireland relations
 Brazilians in Ireland
 Immigration to Brazil
 Irish and German Mercenary Soldiers' Revolt
 European immigration to Brazil
 Irish people

Bibliography
Brazilian Historical and Geographical Institute -Revista do Instituto Histórico e Geográfico Brasileiro-, 1918, Tomo 83, "Alternate Pictures" "Quadros Alternados", on the mercenaries rebellion in which Irish settlers took part, according to the contemporary narrative by the Germany mercenary Theodor Bösche, page 179 onwards
 William Cotter Irish officer in Dom Pedro's army of imperial Brazil
 Irish immigrants in Rio de Janeiro: routine and rebellion, Universidade de São Paulo, in Portuguese

References

External links

Ethnic groups in Brazil
 
Brazil
Brazil